During the 1977–78 season, Heart of Midlothian F.C. competed in the Scottish First Division, the Scottish Cup, the Scottish League Cup and the East of Scotland Shield

Fixtures

Friendlies

League Cup

Scottish Cup

East of Scotland Shield

Scottish First Division

Scottish First Division table

Squad information

|}

See also
List of Heart of Midlothian F.C. seasons

References

Statistical Record 77–78

External links
Official Club website

Heart of Midlothian F.C. seasons
Heart of Midlothian